Sylvan Lake is a large lake in central Alberta, Canada. The resort town of Sylvan Lake is established on the shores of the lake, west of the city of Red Deer. 

Development and conservation

Six communities are developed adjacent to the shores of Sylvan Lake. The Town of Sylvan Lake is located on the southeast shore, while five summer villages – Sunbreaker Cove, Birchcliff, Jarvis Bay, Norglenwold and Half Moon Bay – are adjacent to the lake's northeast and southwest shores.

Sylvan Lake is one of the most popular recreational areas in Alberta, with over 1.5 million visitors per year. Water based recreational activities include boating, dragon boat racing, swimming, windsurfing, water skiing in summer and ice fishing, skating and snowmobiling during the winter months. Wild Rapids Waterslides, formerly one of the largest waterslide parks in Alberta, is located on the shore of the lake within the Town of Sylvan Lake, but has ceased operations as of 2016.

Sylvan Lake Park and Jarvis Bay Provincial Park are established on the southern and eastern shores.

See also
Lakes of Alberta

References

Lacombe County
Lakes of Alberta
Red Deer County